Richard Spencer Schu (born January 26, 1962) is an American former professional baseball third baseman and coach who played in Major League Baseball (MLB) for the Philadelphia Phillies (–), Baltimore Orioles (–), Detroit Tigers, California Angels, and Montreal Expos. Schu also played in the Nippon Professional Baseball (NPB) for the Nippon Ham Fighters (–).

Playing career
Schu grew up in Fair Oaks, California, and was signed as an amateur free agent out of Del Campo High School by the Philadelphia Phillies.

Schu made his Major League debut at Veterans Stadium on September 1, 1984, starting at third base for the Phillies, and went 0-3. He returned to the major leagues in May 1985 after hitting .284 for the Portland Beavers, and replaced future Hall of Famer Mike Schmidt at third base, with Schmidt moving to first. After Schu hit .252 with seven home runs in 1985 and 1986, Schmidt returned to third and Schu became a bench player. After four seasons with the Phillies, he joined the Baltimore Orioles, and played for them, the Detroit Tigers and the California Angels before returning to Philadelphia in 1991.

Coaching career
On July 11, 2007, Schu replaced Kevin Seitzer as the hitting coach for the Arizona Diamondbacks. Schu continued in this role until May 7, 2009.

On November 4, 2009, the Washington Nationals announced the hiring of Schu to be an organizational hitting instructor. He became their hitting coach on Monday July 22, 2013 after the Nationals fired Rick Eckstein.  His contract expired after the 2017 season. On November 9, 2017, Schu was hired as the assistant hitting coach for the San Francisco Giants.

Personal life
Schu resides in El Dorado Hills, California. He is married to his high school sweetheart, Keri.

References

External links

Rick Schu at Baseball Gauge

1962 births
Living people
American expatriate baseball players in Canada
American expatriate baseball players in Japan
Arizona Diamondbacks coaches
Baltimore Orioles players
Baseball coaches from Pennsylvania
Baseball players from Pennsylvania
Bend Phillies players
California Angels players
Detroit Tigers players
Edmonton Trappers players
Major League Baseball hitting coaches
Major League Baseball third basemen
Montreal Expos players
Nippon Ham Fighters players
Nippon Professional Baseball first basemen
Oklahoma City 89ers players
Ottawa Lynx players
Peninsula Pilots players
People from El Dorado Hills, California
People from Fair Oaks, California
Philadelphia Phillies players
Portland Beavers players
Rochester Red Wings players
Sacramento City Panthers baseball players
Scranton/Wilkes-Barre Red Barons players
Spartanburg Traders players
Washington Nationals coaches